Whitetop may refer to:

 Lepidium draba, a plant from the family Brassicaceae
 Rhynchospora colorata, a plant from the family Cyperaceae
 Whitetopping, a construction practice
 A covered wagon, also called a "whitetop"
 Whitetop Mountain, Virginia, United States
 Whitetop Mountain (British Columbia), Canada
 Whitetop, Virginia, a village in Virginia, United States